Rail Europe may refer to:

 Rail Europe (company), a European rail ticket distributor
 Rail Europe, Inc., a North American distributor of European rail products
 Raileurope.co.uk, an online booking service for train travel
 Oui.sncf, an internet ticket agent

See also
 Eurail, a European rail pass
 RailNetEurope, a non-profit travel association
 Rail transport in Europe